Chas Jankel is the debut solo studio album by the English singer and multi-instrumentalist Chaz Jankel. It was originally released in 1980, on the label A&M. Ian Dury and The Blockheads's first and only album without Jankel, Laughter, was released the same year.

The first track on the album "Ai No Corrida", was covered by Quincy Jones a year later in 1981 and was a UK chart hit for him. The song has also been covered by the Nylons and Laura More with Uniting Nations.

The album was re-issued in 2005 on Angel Air in the United Kingdom as a digitally remastered CD, featuring one bonus track, "Little Eva" which was co-written by Jankel with Ian Dury and was originally released on Jankel's 1985 album Looking at You.

The track "Reverie" was used as a sample by Brooklyn-based hip hop collective Pro Era in the song, "Like Water", which is featured on the group's second mixtape as a collective, "P.E.E.P: The aPROcalypse" (2012).

Track listing

Personnel
Credits are adapted from the album's liner notes.
Chaz Jankel – lead and background vocals; guitar; keyboards; synthesizer; percussion
Mark Isham – soprano saxophone; trumpet; synthesizer
Chris Hunter – alto saxophone; tenor saxophone 
Peter Van Hooke – drums; percussion
Chris Warwick – synthesizer programming; percussion
Kuma Harada – bass guitar on "Just a Thought", and "Lenta Latina"
Paul Westwood – bass guitar on "Ai No Corrida"
Production team
Chaz Jankel – producer; sleeve concept
Peter Van Hooke – producer; inner sleeve photography
Mark Isham – producer 
Chris Warwick – producer
Chris Jenkins – engineer
Mick Glossop – engineer
Philip Bagenal – engineer
Steve Prestage – engineer
Michael Ross – art direction
Simon Ryan – design
Mike Putland – back cover photography

See also
 List of albums released in 1980

References

External links

1980 debut albums
A&M Records albums
Chaz Jankel albums